Lost Pond may refer to:

 Lost Pond (Big Moose, New York)
 Lost Pond, a former name of Big Deer Pond, Hamilton County, New York
 Lost Pond (Oswegatchie SW, New York)